Jean Yarbrough (August 22, 1901 – August 2, 1975) was an American film director.

Biography
Jean Yarbrough was born in Marianna, Arkansas on August 22, 1901.  He attended the University of the South located in Sewanee, Tennessee.  In 1922, Yarbrough entered the film business working in silent pictures, first as a "prop man" and later rising through the ranks to become an assistant director.

By 1936, he was a bona fide director, first doing comedy and musical shorts for RKO which was founded by Joseph P. Kennedy among others. His directorial debut for a feature-length film was Rebellious Daughters which was made by the low-budget studio, Progressive Pictures in 1938.

His greatest success came in the 1940s and 1950s, when he directed comedy teams like Abbott and Costello  (five films: Here Come the Co-Eds, In Society, Jack and the Beanstalk, Lost in Alaska, and The Naughty Nineties), The Bowery Boys (five films: Angels in Disguise, Master Minds, Triple Trouble, Crashing Las Vegas, and Hot Shots) and horror/cult movies that are still fondly remembered to this day, such as The Devil Bat, King of the Zombies, She-Wolf of London, and House of Horrors.

Yarbrough found little difficulty in transitioning from the traditional B-movies which were on the decline, to the new medium of television. He directed many episodes for different TV series throughout the 1950s and 1960s which are widely considered to be the Golden Age of Television. In addition to directing, he had a two-year stint working as both producer and director of the very popular Abbott and Costello Show. He directed some episodes of The Silent Service and Navy Log, also during the 1950s, which were military dramas based on true stories of the United States Navy.

He subsequently directed episodes of Walter Brennan's western series The Guns of Will SonnettTe Addams Family. His last theatrical film was 1967's Hillbillys in a Haunted House, a mixture of comedy, horror and country music, starring Basil Rathbone and Lon Chaney Jr.

Partial filmography

 The Devil Bat (1940)
 King of the Zombies (1941)
 The Gang's All Here (1941)
 Father Steps Out (1941)
 Let's Go Collegiate (1941)
 Good Morning, Judge (1943)
 In Society (1944)
 Moon Over Las Vegas (1944)
 Here Come The Co-Eds (1945)
 The Naughty Nineties (1945)
 House of Horrors (1946)
 Inside Job (1946)
 She-Wolf of London (1946)
 Cuban Pete (1946)
 The Brute Man (1946)
 Shed No Tears (1948)
 The Creeper (1948)
 The Challenge (1948)
 Holiday in Havana (1949)
 Sideshow (1950)
 According to Mrs. Hoyle (1951)
 Jack and the Beanstalk (1952)
 Lost in Alaska (1952)
 Crashing Las Vegas (1956)
 The Women of Pitcairn Island (1956)
 Footsteps in the Night (1957)
 Saintly Sinners (1962)
 Hillbillys in a Haunted House (1967)
 The Over-the-Hill Gang (1969) TV-movie

References

External links

Jean Yarbrough biography, Search my Trash.com; accessed March 17, 2014.

1901 births
1975 deaths
People from Marianna, Arkansas
Sewanee: The University of the South alumni
Film directors from Arkansas
Horror film directors